Mija Knežević is Montenegrin fashion celebrity and online brand management expert. Knezevic is one of the leading trendsetters in Eastern Europe today and has been featured in the Financial Times, Vogue, Elle, L’Officiel, Marie Claire, Cosmopolitan, W Magazine, Grazia, Style.com, WWD, Harper's Baazar, Refinery 29, The Cut and others.

Knezevic graduated high school from Institut Le Rosey in Switzerland. In 2012, she obtained her Master's degree from New York University, where she studied Media and Culture.

Career 
Knezevic is known for her talent in helping emerging brands as well as her individual style. Knezevic has worked with brands such as Burberry, Tiffany & Co; Yoox Group, Tod’s, Belstaff, Gorgio Armani, Ferrgamo, Farm Rio, Patou, Baum und pferdgarten, Mietis, Stand Studio, Emilio Pucci, Sunnei, Wandler, Plan C, Proenza Schouler, W Magazine, Tory Burch and Marina Abramovic Institute.

References

Living people
Year of birth missing (living people)
New York University alumni
Alumni of Institut Le Rosey
Montenegrin businesspeople